Norma Heyman (born 1937) is a British film producer and actress. Heyman produced the 1983 independent film, The Honorary Consul in 1983, becoming the first British woman to produce an independent feature film entirely by herself. In 1988, Heyman and producer Hank Moonjean received an Academy Award for Best Picture nomination for their producing the dramatic film, Dangerous Liaisons.

Her film credits also include the 2005 British comedy, Mrs Henderson Presents, which she produced with Bob Hoskins.

Born Norma Pownall, she married British film producer and talent agent John Heyman in 1960. Norma and John had two children, including David, the founder of Heyday Films and the producer of the Harry Potter film series. John Heyman and Norma Heyman divorced during the 1960s after his affair with actress Joanna Shimkus.

In 2013, she co-produced The Thirteenth Tale with her son David.

Filmography
She was a producer in all films unless otherwise noted.

Film

Thanks

Television

Thanks

References

External links

1940 births
British people of English descent
British film producers
British film actresses
Place of birth missing (living people)
Date of birth missing (living people)
Living people